Jackson Narrows Marine Provincial Park is a provincial park in British Columbia, Canada, located on the west side of Mathieson Channel to the north of the community of Bella Bella.

References

North Coast of British Columbia
Provincial parks of British Columbia
1992 establishments in British Columbia
Protected areas established in 1992
Marine parks of Canada